Mwera can refer to several things related to Tanzania:

Mwera people, an ethnic and linguistic group
Mwera language
Mwera, Zanzibar, a village on Unguja Island, Zanzibar
Mwera (ward)